The least yellow bat (Rhogeessa mira) is a species of vesper bat found only in Mexico.

References

Rhogeessa
Mammals described in 1973
Bats of Mexico
Endemic mammals of Mexico
Taxonomy articles created by Polbot